The enzyme Lysine decarboxylase converts lysine to cadaverine.

References

External links 
 

EC 4.1.1